Two ships of the Royal Navy have borne the name HMS Arachne:

, a  launched in 1809 and sold in 1837
, a sloop launched in 1847 and broken up in 1866

Royal Navy ship names